W.A.K.O. World Championships 2001 were the joint thirteenth world kickboxing championships (the other was held earlier that year in Maribor, Slovenia) hosted by the W.A.K.O. organization.  It was the second championships to be held in Serbia and Montenegro (the Europeans had been held here back in 1996) and was open to amateur men and women across the world.

There were three styles on offer at Belgrade; Full-Contact, Low-Kick (men only) and Thai-Boxing (men only).  The other typical styles, Semi Contact, Musical Forms etc., had taken place at the sister event in Maribor.  By the end of the championships Russia was the strongest nation overall, followed by Belarus in second and hosts Serbia and Montenegro in third.  The event was held over five days in Belgrade, Serbia and Montenegro, starting on Wednesday, 21 November and finishing on Sunday, 25 November 2001.

Full-Contact

Full-Contact is a form of kickboxing where both punches and kicks are thrown with full force with strikes below the waist prohibited.  Most matches are settled by either a point's decision or referee stoppage and like most other amateur contact sports, head and body protection is compulsory.  More detail on Full-Contact rules can be found on the W.A.K.O. website.  At Belgrade both men and women took part in the style with the men having twelve divisions ranging from 51 kg/112.2 lbs to over 91 kg/+200.2 lbs, and the women had seven ranging from 48 kg/105.6 lbs to over 70 kg/+143 lbs.  Notable winners included was Roman Romanchuk who would also have some success in amateur boxing and Fouad Habbani who made the successful transition to Full-Contact having won gold in Light-Contact at Maribor.  By the end of the championship Russia was by far the most successful country in the category winning seven golds and six bronzes in both male and female competition.

Men's Full-Contact Kickboxing Medals Table

Women's Full-Contact Kickboxing Medals Table

Low-Kick

Low-kick is a style of kickboxing which is similar to Full-Contact, allowed strikes (punches and kicks) to be thrown at full force, with the only difference being that strikes are also allowed to the legs of the opponent.  Fights are mainly won by a point's decision or by a referee stoppage, with head and body protection mandatory for all contestants.  More details on the rules can be found at the W.A.K.O. website.  At Belgrade the category was open to men only with twelve weight divisions ranging from 51 kg/112.2 lbs to over 91 kg/+200.2 lbs.  The most notable gold medallist was Ivan Strugar who won yet another gold medal (sixth overall) at a W.A.K.O. championships, while future K-1 MAX and Superleague fighters (and brothers) José Reis and Luis Reis won bronze.  By the end of the championships the host nation Yugoslavia was the strongest country in Low-Kick winning five gold, one silver and one bronze.

Men's Low-Kick Kickboxing Medals Table

Thai-Boxing

Thai-boxing (more commonly known as Muay Thai is the most physical style of kickboxing in which the contestants use punches, kicks, elbows and knees to attempt to defeat their opponent, often by referee stoppage or via a point's decision.  As with other forms of amateur kickboxing, participants must wear head and body protection.  At Belgrade the category was open to men only with twelve weight divisions ranging from 51 kg/112.2 lbs to over 91 kg/+200.2 lbs.  Notable winners included Andrei Kulebin winning the first of what would later be many world titles and future It's Showtime 77 MAX world champion Dmitry Shakuta.  As with the last world championships Belarus proved to be absolutely dominant once more in Thai-boxing, going one better this time by picking up an incredible nine gold medals.

Men's Thai-Boxing Medals Table

Overall Medals Standing (Top 5)

See also
List of WAKO Amateur World Championships
List of WAKO Amateur European Championships

References

External links
 WAKO World Association of Kickboxing Organizations Official Site

WAKO Amateur World Championships events
Kickboxing in Serbia
2001 in kickboxing
International sports competitions in Belgrade
2001 in Serbian sport
November 2001 sports events in Europe
2000s in Belgrade